The 2021 season is Blaublitz Akita' s first season in the J2 League,. The annual club slogan is "秋田一体".

Squad
As of  2021.

J2 League

Emperor's Cup

Other games

Gallery

References

External links
 J.League official site

Blaublitz Akita
Blaublitz Akita seasons